Galina Mikhailovna Zhitnyuk (January 30 1925, Kiev Governorate – July 16 2020, Chișinău) was a Soviet and Moldovan politician.

She served as Minister of Light Industry 1965–1987.

Biography 
She was born in 1925 in Pustovarovka village.

Higher education - graduated from the Moscow State Textile University.

From 1942 she worked as an accountant.

Since 1949 - in economic, social and political work.

In 1953 - 1962 - engineer at textile enterprises in Riga and Chișinău.

Since 1962, the director of the Chisinau knitting factory "Steaua Roshie".

Since 1965 Minister of Light Industry of the Moldavian SSR.

Honored Engineer of the Moldavian SSR.

Member of the Central Committee of the Communist Party of Moldova.

She was elected a deputy of the Supreme Soviet of the Moldavian SSR of the 6th-11th convocations.

Member of the CPSU since 1955. Delegate of the XXII Congress of the CPSU.

She died on July 16, 2020 in Chișinău.

References

1925 births
2020 deaths
20th-century Moldovan women politicians
People from Kyiv Oblast
People's commissars and ministers of the Moldavian Soviet Socialist Republic
Recipients of the Order of Friendship of Peoples
Recipients of the Order of Lenin
Recipients of the Order of the Red Banner of Labour
Women government ministers of Moldova
Soviet women in politics